From 2011 to 2014, the Sukma Games had been held annually with the National Sports Council held the games every odd year in Kuala Lumpur, while the state held the games every even year. The odd year Sukma Games featured only optional sports while the even year Sukma Games featured only core sports.

The 2013 Sukma Games, officially known as the 16th Sukma Games was held from 28 June to 7 July 2013 and featured 130 events in 18 optional sports, whereas the 2014 Sukma Games, officially known as the 17th Sukma Games was held in Perlis from 26 May to 9 June 2014 and featured 389 events in 24 core sports.

On 25 February 2015, sports minister, Khairy Jamaluddin announced that the odd year Sukma Games has been abolished, citing fully packed state sports agenda and high cost for state sport councils to fund a Sukma Games contingent every year.

Football at the 2014 Sukma Games

Organisation

Venues
The 17th Sukma Games had 16 venues for the games, while the 16th Sukma Games had 11 venues for the games, 5 in Kuala Lumpur and 6 in Selangor.

17th Sukma Games

16th Sukma Games

Marketing

Logo 

The logo of the 2014 Sukma Games is an image of a lion consists of four colours which are Yellow, blue, red and white. Yellow represents enthusiasm, Blue represents unity and harmony in sports, Red represents the fighting spirit, insistence and the bravery in facing challenges and White represents solemnity, pure soul and sincerity.

Mascot
The official mascot of the 2014 Sukma Games is a lion named "Singa Utara" (Northern Lion). Despite the fact that the lion does not exist in Malaysia, the lion is regarded as the icon and state identity of Perlis. Its adoption as the games' mascot is to reflect the courage, agility, activeness and intelligence characteristic of the participating athletes and the caring characteristics of the Perlis citizens. Meanwhile, the mascot of the 2013 Sukma Games is a tiger named Harimau Muda (Youth Tiger), which was also the mascot of the 2011 Sukma Games.

Songs
The theme Song of the 2014 Sukma Games is "Seiring Menuju Kecemerlangan" (Together Towards Excellence).

The games

Participating states
2013–2014 Sukma Games

  
  
  
  
  
  
  
  
  
  
  
  
  
 

2014 Sukma Games only

Sports
2013 Sukma Games

 Aquatics
 
 
 
 
 
 
 
 
 
 
 
 
 
 
 
 
 
 
 
  
2014 Sukma Games

 Aquatics

Medal table

Broadcasting
Radio Televisyen Malaysia was responsible for live streaming of several events, opening and closing ceremony of the games.

Concerns and controversies
2013 Sukma Games
 At the 2013 Sukma Games, Malaysian Police have arrested three handball players on charges of raping a female officer of the women's handball squad at the Sukma Games Village in Malaysia. The victim alleged that she was raped on Wednesday at the sports village in Universiti Putra Malaysia (UPM) situated in Serdang district. The 19-year-old woman was in a semi-conscious state when she was repeatedly raped in a hostel room at the university.
2014 Sukma Games
 On 29 May, the canvas roof of the recently completed Aquatics Centre came down at 2pm on that day. The late completion of the complex had forced organisers to delay the swimming and diving events by a day. The aquatics competition was initially scheduled to start on Wednesday. Sports minister Khairy Jamaluddin had gone to the site to witness the situation. The roof is then removed and the competition continues.
 On complaints that tenpin bowling athletes had to play until the wee hours of the morning, all contingents were notified that the bowling centre for the 17th Sukma had only 24 lanes, and the competition had to be extended. The first day of the tenpin bowling competition at the Kayangan Mall on 27 May was delayed for three hours due to power failure while on Monday, the team event had to be extended until the small hour of the morning due to damaged lanes.
 In addition to the construction delayed for the Indoor Stadium, audience attended badminton games held on 31 May annoyed by water leaking from the roof at the newly built Indoor Badminton Stadium. Leaks were spotted at different parts of the Badminton hall near the seats. But, fortunately did not interrupted the games.
 5 athletes were downed with minor food poisoning.

Related events

Paralympiad Malaysia

21 to 25 August 2014.

References

External links
 2013 Sukma Games official website
 

Sport in Malaysia
Sukma Games
2013 in multi-sport events
2014 in multi-sport events
Sukma
Sukma